Samuelu Penitala Teo is a Tuvaluan politician. He is the son of Sir Fiatau Penitala Teo who was appointed as the first Governor General of Tuvalu (1978–1986) following independence from Great Britain. Samuelu Teo himself served as the Acting Governor-General of Tuvalu from January until 28 September 2021. He had succeeded Acting Governor-General Teniku Talesi and remained in office until the Rev. Tofiga Vaevalu Falani was sworn in as the 10th Governor-General in September 2021.

Career 
He was first elected to the Parliament of Tuvalu at the 1998 general election to represent the constituency of Niutao. He served as the Minister of Works, Energy and Communications in the governments led by Ionatana Ionatana (1999-2000) and Lagitupu Tuilimu (2000-2001). He was the Minister for Natural Resources in the governments led by Faimalaga Luka (2001) and Koloa Talake (2001–2002). He was re-elected in the 2002 Tuvaluan general election, then lost his seat in the 2006 Tuvaluan general election when the vote of the Tuvaluan electorate resulted in the election of 8 new members to the 15 member parliament.

Samuelu Teo was again elected to represent Niutao in the 2015 Tuvaluan general election. The 2015 election was strongly contested with 6 candidates including the two incumbent MPs (Vete Sakaio and Fauoa Maani) and three former MPs (Sir Tomu Sione, Tavau Teii and Teo).

Following the 2019 Tuvaluan general election, on 19 September 2019, the members of parliament elected Kausea Natano from Funafuti as prime minister; and Teo was elected as Speaker of the Parliament of Tuvalu.

His brother Feleti Penitala Teo (b. 9 Oct. 1962) was attorney general of Tuvalu (1991-2000); and in December 2014 he was appointed the Executive Director of the Western and Central Pacific Fisheries Commission (WCPFC).

References 

Governors-General of Tuvalu
Members of the Parliament of Tuvalu
People from Niutao
Living people
Year of birth missing (living people)
Speakers of the Parliament of Tuvalu